The Australian Women's Sevens, currently hosted in Sydney, is an annual rugby sevens tournament and one of the stops on the World Rugby Women's Sevens Series. Australia joined the women's circuit in 2017 for the fifth edition of the series.

Originally hosted at the Sydney Football Stadium prior to its demolition and rebuilding, both the men's and women's events for the Sydney Sevens tournament were moved to the Sydney Showground Stadium in 2019, and then to Western Sydney Stadium for 2020.

History

Champions

See also
 Australian Sevens (men's tournament)

References

 
World Rugby Women's Sevens Series tournaments
Recurring sporting events established in 2017
International women's rugby union competitions hosted by Australia
2017 establishments in Australia